Gandhi Ashram School is a Jesuit Educational Institution with a musical twist, located in rural Kalimpong, India in the Eastern Himalayan region. The private unaided, co-educational English medium school was started in 1993 by Fr. Edward McGuire SJ, a Canadian Jesuit priest. It admits students of the local community as well as from remote areas that come from low-income and difficult backgrounds.

Schools in West Bengal
1993 establishments in West Bengal
Educational institutions established in 1993
Kalimpong